List of Masonic buildings in the United States identifies notable Masonic buildings in the United States.  These have served as meeting halls by Masonic lodges, Grand Lodges or other Masonic bodies.  Many of the buildings were built to house Masonic meetings and ritual activities in their upper floors, and to provide commercial space below.  Many of the buildings listed have received landmark status, either by being listed on the National Register of Historic Places (NRHP) or listed by various State or City preservation agencies.

In 2021, more than 400 Masonic buildings are listed here.

KEY

Alabama

Alaska

Arizona

Arkansas

California
Masons in California grew from 258 members in 1850 to over 63,000 in 1918, declining to 46,000 in 2019.

Colorado

Connecticut

Delaware

District of Columbia

Florida

Georgia

Hawaii

Idaho

Illinois

Indiana

Iowa

Kansas

Kentucky

Louisiana

Maine

Maryland

Massachusetts

Boston has been the site of several significant Masonic buildings.

In 1830, the Grand Lodge of Massachusetts bought land on the corner of Tremont Street and Turnagain Alley. A Temple was constructed on the site and dedicated in 1832, but initially could not be owned by the Grand Lodge because of legal limitations on the value of real estate that the Grand Lodge could hold. Turnagain Alley became Temple Place and the Temple School, established by Bronson Alcott, was housed there during the 1830s. The Temple also held a concert hall and was the site of many public lectures by Ralph Waldo Emerson, including his reading of The Transcendentalist in 1842. Masons used the Masonic Temple for meetings until 1858, when the building was sold to the U.S. government for use as a courthouse. The government sold the building in 1885 and it was remodeled into commercial space for the R. H. Stearns department store.

Beginning in 1859, Boston's Masons occupied a building at the corner of Tremont and Boylston Streets that was known as Winthrop House, and that was rededicated as "Freemason's Hall" in December 1859. That building was destroyed by fire in April 1864. A grand new Masonic Temple building, designed by Merrill G. Wheelock, was built in its place on the same site and dedicated in 1867. The second temple was also destroyed by fire in 1895 and replaced at the same location with a building designed by George F. Loring and Sanford Phipps, dedicated on December 27, 1899.

Also in Massachusetts:

Michigan

Minnesota

Mississippi

Missouri

Montana

Nebraska

Nevada

New Hampshire

New Jersey

New Mexico

New York

North Carolina

North Dakota

Ohio

Oklahoma

Oregon

Pennsylvania

Rhode Island

South Carolina

South Dakota

Tennessee

Texas

Utah

Vermont

Virginia

Washington

West Virginia

Wisconsin

Wyoming

Puerto Rico
List of masonic buildings in Puerto Rico, an insular area of the United States, include:

See also
List of Masonic buildings, for all other notable ones world-wide

References

 Mississippi
Masonic
Masonic buildings